The New Romance is the second studio album from Pretty Girls Make Graves, released on September 9, 2003 on the label Matador Records.

Track listing

Personnel
Andrea Zollo – vocals
Nick Dewitt – drums, samples, keyboards, vocals
Derek Fudesco – bass guitar, vocals
Nathan Thelen – guitar, vocals
J. Clark – guitar, keyboards, samples

Pretty Girls Make Graves albums
2003 albums
Albums produced by Phil Ek
Matador Records albums
Albums recorded at Bear Creek Studio